Saperda puncticollis is a species of beetle in the family Cerambycidae. It was described by Thomas Say in 1824. It has been found in Canada and the United States.

References

puncticollis
Beetles described in 1824